Tere Tereba (born in Warren, Ohio) is an American fashion designer, writer, and actress. She is well known as one of the pioneers of women's "contemporary" clothing design and for playing "Ingrid Joyner" in Andy Warhol's Bad (1977). She is also the author of Mickey Cohen: The Life and Crimes of L.A.'s Notorious Mobster, published in 2012, which has been released in hardcover, trade paperback, e-book and audio editions. The book has also been translated into French, Italian and Chinese.

Biography

Beginnings
Tere was raised in Los Angeles, California, where  her perspective was shaped and influenced by the city itself, along with the music, imagery and pop culture of the late 1960s. She spent her teen years going to clubs on the Sunset Strip to see musicians like Jimi Hendrix, Michael Bloomfield and Jim Morrison perform.

Career
Rocker Jim Morrison's girlfriend, Pamela Courson, discovered Tere and recruited her to design for her  La Cienega Boulevard boutique, Themis. Simultaneously, Tere was hired as an apprentice by Young Edwardian, then the most important junior fashion label in the country, to sketch designs in the back room. Six months later, she proved herself by designing a collection which sold tens of millions of dollars at retail stores such as Saks Fifth Avenue, Bloomingdale's, and Neiman-Marcus. Before reaching voting age, Tere herself had become a force in the fashion industry.

Tere caught the attention of Andy Warhol in Los Angeles. They invited her to visit the Factory, then at 33 Union Square West, when she came to New York. Soon she was writing for and being written about in Andy Warhol's Interview Magazine. Warhol once described Tere as "looking like Hedy Lamarr and acting like Lucille Ball." Her passion for rock music segued into film, which resulted in her interviewing many prominent filmmakers for the magazine, such as Steven Spielberg and Martin Scorsese.

Next, she was cast in the black comedy, Andy Warhol's Bad (1977), directed by Jed Johnson. She played the mother of an autistic child, which was a ground-breaking subject for film at the time.

Tere continued creating fashion trends (her designs garnered 24 covers of Women's Wear Daily) and setting trends in her personal life with her idiosyncratic apartment, which was featured in Architectural Digest and as an early collector of artist, Jean-Michel Basquiat. Golden Age of Hollywood photographer, George Hurrell, was brought out of retirement to photograph her.

She emerged from a hiatus to design cutting-edge fashions for the twenty-somethings of the 21st Century.  Paris Hilton was soon seen wearing Tere Tereba's latest designs for bebe stores.

No longer active in the fashion world, Tereba has written a biography of the notorious Hollywood mob boss Mickey Cohen that delves into the Los Angeles underworld, titled Mickey Cohen: The Life and Crimes of L.A.'s Notorious Mobster. The book was released on May 1, 2012.

Filmography
Andy Warhol's Bad (1977)

References

Further reading
Tereba, Tere. Mickey Cohen: The Life and Crimes of L.A.'s Notorious Mobster (ECW Press, May 1, 2012)

External links
Tere Tereba's Official Web Site
 Beyond 'Gangster Squad': The Real Mickey Cohen, by Tere Tereba
 Video: Book Trailer for Mickey Cohen: The Life and Crimes of L.A.’s Notorious Mobster
 Video: Tere Tereba discusses mobster Mickey Cohen

bebe Official Website

American film actresses
American fashion designers
American women fashion designers
Cultural historians
Living people
Writers from Ohio
Artists from Los Angeles
People from Warren, Ohio
Year of birth missing (living people)
Writers from Los Angeles
Actresses from Los Angeles
21st-century American women